Nextbook is a nonprofit, Jewish organization founded in  2003 by Elaine  Bernstein's Keren Keshet Foundation to promote Jewish literacy and support Jewish literature, culture and ideas.  The organization sponsors public lectures, commissions books on Jewish topics through Schocken Books, and publishes an online magazine, Tablet Magazine.

On June 9, 2009, Nextbook changed the name of its online magazine from Nextbook to Tablet Magazine.

As of 2009  Nextbook is funded primarily by the Jewish Communal Fund of New York, a donor-advised fund to which Keren Keshet contributes $16 million per year, according to the 990 tax filing available in 2009. The New York Jewish Week describes Keren Keshet as a "powerhouse" in Jewish philanthropy that provided essentially all of Tablet's $5 million annual budget.  Jonathan Harris became editorial director in 2007.

As of 2012 the president of the board is Arthur W. Fried, and Morton Landowne is executive director, described by JTA as a "New York businessman and longtime Modern Orthodox lay leader" whose community experience could  help in correcting what some critics call Nextbook's inability to establish a broader reach across the Jewish community.

References

External links
 Tablet Magazine
 Nextbook.org

Magazines established in 2003
Secular Jewish culture in the United States
Jewish culture
Jewish magazines published in the United States
Jewish organizations based in the United States
Non-profit organizations based in the United States
2003 establishments in the United States